Pisodonophis copelandi is an eel in the family Ophichthidae (worm/snake eels). It was described by Albert William Herre in 1953. It is a marine, tropical eel which is known from the Philippines, in the western central Pacific Ocean.

Named in honor of botanist Edwin Bingham Copeland (1873-1964), who was a founder of the Philippine College of Agriculture.

References

Ophichthidae
Taxa named by Albert William Herre
Fish described in 1953